Salem Abdullah Omar Salem Ba Abdullah (born 5 July 1986) is an Emarati footballer who plays as a midfielder.

External links
  Salem Statistics At Goalzz.com
http://www.alainfc.net/en/index.php?p=playerinfo&pid=343

Emirati footballers
Al Ain FC players
Al-Wasl F.C. players
Al Jazira Club players
Living people
1986 births
UAE Pro League players
Association football midfielders